"Power Gate" is the fifth single by Japanese singer and voice actress Nana Mizuki. It was released together with her fourth single "Love & History."

Track listing 
 POWER GATE
 Lyrics, composition, arrangement: Toshiro Yabuki
 Ending theme for TV Osaka program M-Voice
 
 Lyrics, composition: Aska
 Arrangement: Tsutomu Ohira
 A cover for 1987 song by Miho Morikawa
 POWER GATE (Vocalless Ver.)
  (Vocalless Ver.)

2002 singles
Nana Mizuki songs
Songs written by Toshiro Yabuki